Jorge Palatsí Gallego (born 18 February 1988 in La Salzadella, Baix Maestrat, Valencian Community) is a Spanish footballer who plays as a goalkeeper.

Honours
Cultural Leonesa
Segunda División B: 2016–17

References

External links

1988 births
Living people
People from Baix Maestrat
Sportspeople from the Province of Castellón
Spanish footballers
Footballers from the Valencian Community
Association football goalkeepers
Segunda División players
Segunda División B players
Tercera División players
Villarreal CF C players
Villarreal CF B players
Villarreal CF players
Girona FC players
Cultural Leonesa footballers
Burgos CF footballers